The Irish Stem Cell Foundation is Ireland's National Stem Cell Research Organisation. A Member of the International Consortium of Stem Cell Networks, the foundation is committed to the pursuit of international cooperation, collaboration and excellence in the stem cell field.


Background
The Irish Stem Cell Foundation is a non-profit organization. It was established in Dublin in October 2009, and is composed of doctors, researchers, patient advocates, science communicators, solicitors, teachers and students.

The foundation's objectives are described as:
 Accelerate Stem Cell Research to cure major illnesses and injury.
 Provide a focus on education in all areas of stem cell research and therapy.
 Establish a forum to promote, foster and exchange accurate information on the progress of stem cell research to all interested parties.
 It also seeks to have appropriate legislation and improve current governance to make Irish Medical Research more competitive internationally and to educate and thus reduce risk to the Irish patient.

The Chief Scientific Officer of the Foundation is Dr Stephen Sullivan 
The Chief Medical Officer of the Foundation is Professor Orla Hardiman.

The foundation has engaged the international and domestic media on the topic of stem cell tourism, where patients are scammed by unregulated clinics making medically and scientifically unsubstantiated claims to patients over the internet. Such experimental protocols endanger patients' lives and harm the reputation of legitimate stem cell research and clinical trials (which are tightly regulated).

The foundation agrees with the Irish Council Of Bioethics and the Irish Committee for Assisted Human Reproduction that Irish stem cell research needs a strong, transparent ethical and legislative structure. In 2010, the Foundation issued a public policy document on embryonic stem cell research.

In 2012 the Irish Stem Cell Foundation hosted its second conference, the Irish Stem Cell Summit, in Dublin. The Summit focused on the underdevelopment of Irish policy and law pertaining to stem cells, and the detrimental effect this has on the quality of research in the area, as well as the damage this is doing to public trust, international investment and collaboration.

In 2013, the Foundation led a campaign with other Irish medical research charities to question the wisdom of abolishing Ireland's independent Chief Scientific Adviser. More recently, the Foundation joined with the Wellcome Trust and the Royal Society of Medicine in the UK to urge the European Parliament to maintain funding for European stem cell research.

The Irish Stem Cell Foundation is not affiliated with the lobby group calling itself 'The Adult Stem Cell Foundation of Ireland'. The Irish Stem Cell Foundation supports all types of stem cell research governed by an open and transparent ethics structure. This position is consistent with those formulated by several other Irish groups including The Commission for Assisted Human Reproduction, The Irish Council of Bioethics, and The Irish Patients Association.

References

External links
Irish Stem Cell Foundation
International Consortium of Stem Cell Networks

Stem cell research
2009 establishments in Ireland
2009 in science
Organisations based in Dublin (city)
Non-profit organisations based in the Republic of Ireland